Khvarada is a rural locality (a selo) in Khvartikuninsky Selsoviet, Gergebilsky District, Republic of Dagestan, Russia. The population was 43 as of 2010. There are 3 streets.

Geography 
Khvarada is located 15 km southwest of Gergebil (the district's administrative centre) by road. Khvartikuni and Kurmi are the nearest rural localities.

References 

Rural localities in Gergebilsky District